Melvyn Rubenfire is a cardiologist in the University of Michigan Health System, as well as a professor in the department of internal medicine. He is also director of the Preventive cardiology department.

Clinical interests 
Rubenfire's clinical and research interests include: Atherosclerosis detection, preventive cardiology, lipid management, pulmonary hypertension, coronary risk factors and vascular reactivity.

Education 
Rubenfire earned a Doctor of Medicine degree from Wayne State University in Detroit, Michigan in 1965. He served his residency in internal medicine at Sinai Hospital in Detroit, Michigan, from 1965–1968. He then served two fellowships (1968-1970) in Cardiovascular disease at the Henry Ford Hospital in Detroit, Michigan.

His certifications include: Internal Medicine in 1965, Cardiovascular Disease in 1973, and Medical Examiner in 1965. He also received a qualification in Lipid Management in 2005.  Rubenfire holds the following fellowships: Fellow of the American College of Physicians (Internal Medicine), Fellow of the American College of Cardiology, and Fellow of the American College of Chest Physicians.

Career

Earlier positions
From 1970 to 1989 he was the Chief of Cardiology at Detroit's Sinai Hospital, becoming Chairman of the Department of Internal Medicine in 1984. At the same time he served as an assistant professor (1971-1976), associate professor (1977-1984), and professor (1984-1991) at Wayne State University.

Current practice 
In 1991 Rubenfire came to the University of Michigan as a professor. He is the director of the university's Cardiac Rehabilitation, Preventive Cardiology, and Lipid Management programs. He currently works at the University of Michigan Health System's Cardiovascular Medicine outpatient facility at Domino's Farms Office Park in Ann Arbor, Michigan, and the Alfred Taubman Health Care Center. At Domino's Farms, he practices preventive cardiology, cardiac rehabilitation and the Cardiovascular Executive Health Program. He practices pulmonary hypertension at the Alfred Taubman Health Care Center.

Recognition
The University of Michigan has raised funds to establish a Melvyn Rubenfire Professorship in Preventive Cardiology.

Footnotes

American cardiologists
Living people
Year of birth missing (living people)
Wayne State University alumni
University of Michigan faculty
American Jews
Fellows of the American College of Cardiology